Hsieh Yun-ting (born 8 August 1999) is a Taiwanese weightlifter. He represented Chinese Taipei at the 2020 Summer Olympics in Tokyo, Japan.

References

External links
 

Living people
1999 births
Taiwanese male weightlifters
Weightlifters at the 2020 Summer Olympics
Olympic weightlifters of Taiwan
21st-century Taiwanese people